Satta may refer to:

People

Surname 
 Melissa Satta (born 1986), Italian television presenter
 Salvatore Satta (1902–1975)
 Sebastiano Satta (1867–1914), Italian poet, writer, lawyer and journalist

Given name 
 Satta Sheriff (born 1998), activist

Media 
 Satta (album), a 2001 album by Boozoo Bajou
 Satta (2003 film), a Bollywood political drama film
 Satta (2004 film), an Indian Telugu-language action drama film

Other uses 
 Satta (spider), a genus of spiders in the family Lycosidae
 Satta gambling, a form of betting and lottery
 Swiss Air Traffic Control Technical Association, the association of Swiss Air Navigation Service (ANS) technical professionals
 The Pali word for sattva, a sentient being in Buddhism
 Mount Satta and Satta Pass, in Shizuoka, Japan

See also